Evan Baxter may refer to:

 Evan Baxter, fictional character in Bruce Almighty and Evan Almighty
Evan Buchanan Baxter  (1844–1885), Russian-born Scottish physician